No Plan is an extended play, comprising songs written and recorded by English musician David Bowie, released posthumously on 8 January 2017. The release coincided with what would have been Bowie's 70th birthday, almost a year after his death. No Plan compiles the original songs written for Bowie's Off-Broadway musical, Lazarus, including the titular "Lazarus", "No Plan", "Killing a Little Time", and "When I Met You". The songs were first recorded by the cast of the musical as part of its official soundtrack. The recordings featured on No Plan come from the sessions for Bowie's twenty-fifth and final studio album Blackstar, with "Lazarus" appearing as the third track on the album. Upon release, No Plan debuted at #138 on the Billboard 200, selling more than 5,000 units in its first week there. The music video for the title track was also released in accompaniment with the EP. It was directed by Tom Hingston.

Critical reception

The EP received positive reviews from music critics. Exclaim! critic Calum Slingerland wrote: "One would hope the plan for Bowie going forward would be for him to avoid falling into the category of "rock icon with innumerable posthumous releases," but thankfully for listeners, the music on No Plan holds up." The Independents Andy Gill stated: "Blackstar’s moods and musical modes are continued through these tracks, in which Thomas Jerome Newton's decline eerily reflects Bowie's own."

AllMusic senior critic Stephen Thomas Erlewine thought that the tracks on the EP "provide a bittersweet coda to Bowie's 21st century comeback", even if "these songs don't feel like a surprise". Alfred Soto of Spin stated: "Presenting listeners with two discrete but related musical adventures like ★ and No Plan, the survivors grasped that even the oblique tastes better with a dash of the obvious."

Track listing

Personnel
Personnel adapted from No Plan liner notes.

Musicians
David Bowie – vocals, acoustic & Fender guitars
Donny McCaslin – saxophone, flute & woodwinds
Jason Lindner – piano, Wurlitzer organ & keyboards
Tim Lefebvre – bass
Mark Guiliana – drums & percussion
Ben Monder – guitar

Production
David Bowie – production, mixing
Tony Visconti – production, mixing, engineering
Tom Elmhirst – final master mix
Joe LaPorta – mastering
Kevin Killen – engineering
Kabir Hermon – engineering assistance
Erin Tonkon – engineering assistance
Joe Visciano – assistant to Tom Elmhirst

Design
Barnbrook – cover design
DSS – front cover star image
Jimmy King – Bowie image

Charts

References

External links
 

2017 EPs
David Bowie EPs
EPs published posthumously
Columbia Records EPs
Sony Records albums
Albums produced by Tony Visconti
Albums produced by David Bowie